Prolate spheroidal coordinates are a three-dimensional orthogonal coordinate system that results from rotating the two-dimensional elliptic coordinate system about the focal axis of the ellipse, i.e., the symmetry axis on which the foci are located.  Rotation about the other axis produces oblate spheroidal coordinates.  Prolate spheroidal coordinates can also be considered as a limiting case of ellipsoidal coordinates in which the two smallest principal axes are equal in length.

Prolate spheroidal coordinates can be used to solve various partial differential equations in which the boundary conditions match its symmetry and shape, such as solving for a field produced by two centers, which are taken as the foci on the z-axis.  One example is solving for the wavefunction of an electron moving in the electromagnetic field of two positively charged nuclei, as in the hydrogen molecular ion, H2+. Another example is solving for the electric field generated by two small electrode tips.  Other limiting cases include areas generated by a line segment (μ = 0) or a line with a missing segment (ν=0). The electronic structure of general diatomic molecules with many electrons can also be solved to excellent precision in the prolate spheroidal coordinate system.

Definition

The most common definition of prolate spheroidal coordinates  is

The azimuthal angle  belongs to the interval .

The trigonometric identity

shows that surfaces of constant  form prolate spheroids, since they are ellipses rotated about the axis 
joining their foci. Similarly, the hyperbolic trigonometric identity

shows that surfaces of constant  form 
hyperboloids of revolution.

Scale factors

The scale factors for the elliptic coordinates  are equal

whereas the azimuthal scale factor is

resulting in a metric of 

Consequently, an infinitesimal volume element equals

and the Laplacian can be written

Alternative definition

An alternative and geometrically intuitive set of prolate spheroidal coordinates  are sometimes used, 
Hence, the curves of constant  are prolate spheroids, whereas the curves of constant  are hyperboloids of revolution. The coordinate  belongs to the interval [−1, 1], whereas the  coordinate must be greater than or equal to one.
 
For any point in the plane, the sum  of its distances to the foci equals , whereas their difference  equals .

Unlike the analogous oblate spheroidal coordinates, the prolate spheroid coordinates (σ, τ, φ) are not degenerate; in other words, there is a unique, reversible correspondence between them and the Cartesian coordinates

Alternative scale factors

The scale factors for the alternative elliptic coordinates  are

while the azimuthal scale factor is now

Hence, the infinitesimal volume element becomes

and the Laplacian equals

As is the case with spherical coordinates, Laplace's equation may be solved by the method of separation of variables to yield solutions in the form of prolate spheroidal harmonics, which are convenient to use when boundary conditions are defined on a surface with a constant prolate spheroidal coordinate (See Smythe, 1968).

References

Bibliography

No angles convention
  Uses ξ1 = a cosh μ,  ξ2 = sin ν, and ξ3 = cos φ.
  Same as Morse & Feshbach (1953), substituting uk for ξk.

  Uses coordinates ξ = cosh μ,  η = sin ν, and φ.

Angle convention
  Korn and Korn use the (μ, ν, φ) coordinates, but also introduce the degenerate (σ, τ, φ) coordinates.
  Similar to Korn and Korn (1961), but uses colatitude θ = 90° - ν instead of latitude ν.
  Moon and Spencer use the colatitude convention θ = 90° − ν, and rename φ as ψ.

Unusual convention
  Treats the prolate spheroidal coordinates as a limiting case of the general ellipsoidal coordinates.  Uses (ξ, η, ζ) coordinates that have the units of distance squared.

External links
MathWorld description of prolate spheroidal coordinates

Three-dimensional coordinate systems
Orthogonal coordinate systems